Andrew Jukes is the name of:

Andrew Jukes (missionary) (1847–1931), Anglican missionary and doctor
Andrew Jukes (theologian) (1815–1901)
 Andrew Jukes (surgeon), (died 1821), a surgeon of the East India Company
 Andrew Henry Jukes, political candidate for Calgary West